Ophiojura is a genus of brittle star in its own family, Ophiojuridae. The prefix 'Ophio' comes form the Ancient Greek word for serpent, and 'jura' is derived from the Jura Mountains, which lent its name to the Jurassic period. 

DNA and fossil evidence shows that it diverged from its nearest relatives 160–200 million years ago, with the best estimate 182 Ma, from the Early Jurassic to the Late Triassic.

The following cladogram shows Ophiojura's relationships to its nearest relatives:

References

Ophiuroidea genera
Ophiacanthida
Animals described in 2021